Ofra Bikel (born in Israel) is a documentary filmmaker, and television producer. For more than two decades she was a mainstay of the acclaimed PBS series FRONTLINE producing over 25 award-winning documentaries, ranging from foreign affairs to critiques of the U.S. criminal justice system.

She graduated from the University of Paris and the Institut d'Études Politiques de Paris. She was married briefly to actor and folk singer, Theodore Bikel. She was a researcher for Time, Newsweek, and ABC Television. She moved to public television, producing films for the WGBH series World and later for the long-running series Frontline. In the mid-1970s, Bikel moved to her native Israel and produced more than 15 films. She returned to the U.S. in 1977.

Her documentary films intersperse long interviews with sharp, silent, moments.

Awards
 2007 John Chancellor Award
 2003 The Hillman Prize
 2002 Alfred I. duPont–Columbia University Award
 2002 Robert F. Kennedy Journalism Award
 2002 Emmy Award Outstanding Investigative Journalism—Long Form
 2000 NACDL Champion Of Justice Award
 1994 Grand Prize at the Banff World Television Festival

Works
 The Confessions, 2010
 Close to Home, 2009
 The Hugo Chávez Show, November 2008
 When Kids Get Life, 2007
 The Unexpected Candidate, March 2006
 The O.J. Verdict (2005)
 The Plea (2004)
 Requiem for Frank Lee Smith (2002)
 Saving Elian (2001)
 The Case for Innocence, January 2000
 Snitch (1999)
 The Search for Satan (1995)
 Divided Memories (1995)
 Clarence Thomas and Anita Hill: Public Hearing, Private Pain (1992)
 Poland—The Morning After (1990)
 American Games, Japanese Rules (1988)
 Israel: The Price of Victory (1987)
 The Russians Are Here (1983)
 Who Killed Sadat? (1982)
 Innocence Lost: The Plea (1997)
 Innocence Lost: The Verdict (1993)
 Innocence Lost (1991)

References

External links
"PBS Frontline: 'The Hugo Chavez Show'", The Washington Post, 26 November 2008

American television producers
American women television producers
University of Paris alumni
Sciences Po alumni
Emmy Award winners
Living people
Year of birth missing (living people)
Israeli expatriates in France
Israeli emigrants to the United States
21st-century American women